
Lake Orconcocha (possibly from Quechua urqu male / mountain, -n a suffix, qucha lake) is a lake in Peru located in the Ayacucho Region, Lucanas Province, in the districts Chipao and Puquio. Lake Orconcocha lies southwest of Lake Sawaqucha, northwest of lakes Islaqucha, Pukaqucha and Apiñaqucha and northeast of Lake Yawriwiri.

See also
List of lakes in Peru

References

Lakes of Peru
Lakes of Ayacucho Region